Syria competed at the 2014 Summer Youth Olympics, in Nanjing, China from 16 August to 28 August 2014.

Athletics

Syria qualified two athletes.

Qualification legend: Q=Final A (medal); qB=Final B (non-medal); qC=Final C (non-medal); qD=Final D (non-medal); qE=Final E (non-medal)

Girls
Track & road events

Field events

Basketball

Syria qualified a girls' team based on the 1 June 2014 FIBA 3x3 National Federation Rankings.

Skills competition

Girls' tournament
Roster
 Minerva Ajjan
 Sara Allaw
 Farah Assad
 Sarah Sinjar

Group stage

Fencing

Syria was given a quota to compete by the tripartite committee.

Boys

Swimming

Syria qualified two swimmers.

Boys

Girls

References

2014 in Syrian sport
Nations at the 2014 Summer Youth Olympics
Syria at the Youth Olympics